The Song may refer to:

Geet (1944 film), a 1944 film made in India
T.H.E. (The Hardest Ever), A song by Will.i.am
The Song (2014 film), a 2014 film made in the United States
The Song (Song of the Sea), a 2014 film
The Song (TV Show), a Music TV Show hosted by Krista Marie & Damien Horne